The Eau Claire Vocational School is located in Eau Claire, Wisconsin.

History
The building served as a factory for several years for companies that built trunks, suitcases, telescope cases and phonographs. After being used as a warehouse, it was converted into a vocational school by the National Youth Administration in the early 1940s. During World War II, women were trained at the school to build equipment for the war effort.

In 1967, the school moved to larger facility and was later renamed the Chippewa Valley Technical College. Its former site would be used by the city to house its parks and recreation department. In 2014, it was added to the State and the National Register of Historic Places.

References

School buildings on the National Register of Historic Places in Wisconsin
Industrial buildings and structures on the National Register of Historic Places in Wisconsin
Warehouses on the National Register of Historic Places
National Register of Historic Places in Eau Claire County, Wisconsin
Vocational schools in the United States
Schools in Eau Claire County, Wisconsin
New Deal in Wisconsin
Industrial buildings completed in 1891